Astad is a village with less than 50 inhabitants (2005) on the island of  Öland, Kalmar County,  Sweden. It belongs to the municipality Borgholm.

Populated places in Kalmar County